Charles, Charlie, or Charley Justice may refer to:
 Charles M. Justice (1909–1981), head coach of the University of New Hampshire's football team
 Charley Justice (1913–1974), American baseball player
 Charlie Justice (halfback) (1924–2003), American football halfback
 Charlie Justice (politician) (born 1968), Democratic member of the Florida Senate